Phaecasiophora confixana, the macramé moth, is a species of tortricid moth in the family Tortricidae.

The MONA or Hodges number for Phaecasiophora confixana is 2771.

References

Further reading

External links

 

Olethreutini
Moths described in 1863